Eknath Sambhaji Shinde (pronunciation: [eknaːt̪ʰ ʃin̪d̪e]; born 9 February 1964) is an Indian politician currently serving as the 20th and current Chief Minister of Maharashtra since 30 June 2022. He is also serving as the  Chairman of Shiv Sena since 18 February 2023. He was earlier the Cabinet Minister of Urban Development and Public Works (Public Undertakings) in the Cabinet of Uddhav Thackeray from 2019 to 2022. He is a Member of Legislative Assembly from Kopri-Pachpakhadi constituency of Thane, Maharashtra since 2009.

Early life 
Eknath Shinde hails from the Dare Village, Jawali taluka in Satara, Maharashtra, and belongs to the Maratha community. His family moved to Thane (in the Mumbai outskirts) to earn a living. Eknath studied till 11th standard at Mangala High School & Junior College, Thane. Shinde left education in early years to support his family, however, he resumed his education in 2014 after joining the government ministry. He graduated with a Bachelor of Arts degree from Yashwantrao Chavan Maharashtra Open University in 2020 with a score of 77.25% .

Shinde used to drive an autorickshaw to support his family before entering politics.

Political career
Shinde was introduced to politics by then Thane Shivsena President Anand Dighe in early 1980. Shinde became successor to Dighe's legacy after his death in 2001. He has been elected as Member of Legislative Assembly since 2004 for four consecutive terms.

Position held

Thane Municipal Corporation
 1997 : Elected to the  Thane Municipal Corporation as a corporator for the first time
 2001 : Elected to the post of the leader of the house in Thane Municipal Corporation. 
 2002 : Elected to the Thane Municipal Corporation for the second time

Maharashtra Legislative Assembly & ministries 
 2004 : Elected to the Maharashtra Legislative Assembly for the first time
 2005 : Appointed as the Thane district head of Shiv Sena. First MLA to have been appointed at such a coveted post in the party
 2009 : Elected to the Maharashtra Legislative Assembly for the 2nd time 
 2014 : Elected to the Maharashtra Legislative Assembly for the 3rd time
 October 2014 - December 2014: Leader of opposition Maharashtra Legislative Assembly** 2014 - 2019: Cabinet Minister of PWD (PU) in Maharashtra State Government
 2014 - 2019: Appointed as the guardian minister of Thane District
 2018 : Appointed as a Leader of Shiv Sena Party 
 2019 : Cabinet Minister of Public Health and Family Welfare in Maharashtra State Government 
 2019 : Elected to the Maharashtra Legislative Assembly for the fourth consecutive time
 2019 : Appointed as the minister of Urban Development and Public Works (Public Undertakings)
 2019 : Appointed as the Minister of Home Affairs (Acting) (28 November 2019 - 30 December 2019)
 2020 : Appointed as the guardian minister of Thane district

Chief Minister
 2022 : Appointed as the Chief Minister of Maharashtra by Governor of Maharashtra.

Role in 2022 Maharashtra political crisis

Shinde was in favor of breaking the Maha Vikas Aghadi and reestablishing alliance with the Bharatiya Janata Party. He requested Uddhav Thackeray to break the Maha Vikas Aghadi alliance due to ideological differences and unfair treatment by Congress Party and NCP. His fellow Shiv Sena members said that their complaints were ignored by Uddhav Thackeray and Uddhav favored Congress Party and NCP over his own Shiv Sena members. Shinde gathered 2/3rd members from his party to support his request. The crisis began on 21 June 2022 when Shinde and several other MLAs of the Maha Vikas Aghadi (MVA) coalition moved to Surat in BJP-governed Gujarat, throwing the coalition into a chaos. As a result of Shinde's revolt, Uddhav Thackeray resigned from the post of Chief Minister of Maharashtra and said that he will also resign from the Maharashtra Legislative Council. Shinde successfully reestablished alliance with BJP and was sworn in as the 20th Chief Minister, with Bharatiya Janata Party's Devendra Fadnavis as the Deputy Chief Minister.

Shiv Sena leadership dispute
After Eknath Shinde established the government, he started using the Shiv Sena name and symbols without Uddhav Thackrey. This created issues as Uddhav also claimed to be the leader of Shiv Sena. Uddhav's faction challenged this in court, which was eventually moved to the Election Commission of India. The Commission recognized Eknath Shinde's faction as the real Shiv Sena party, which ended the leadership dispute. The Election Commission also found the changes made to the Shiv Sena party constitution in 2018, under the leadership of Uddhav Thackeray, to be undemocratic. The amendments centralized the party's control and were criticized for not allowing free, fair, and transparent elections for the party positions.

Personal life 
Shinde is married to Lata Shinde.

On 2 June 2000, their son Dipesh (aged 11) and daughter Shubhada (aged 7) went boating in a lake near their native village in Maharashtra. The boat overturned and both the children died by drowning. Shinde went into depression for several months. Anand Dighe provided emotional support to Shinde and entrusted him with greater responsibility in order to keep his mind occupied and away from depression.

Their surviving child, Shrikant Shinde, is an orthopaedic surgeon who has also been the elected Member of Parliament to the Lok Sabha from the Kalyan constituency since 2014 (re-elected in 2019).

Popular culture
Dharmaveer, a 2022 Indian Marathi-language biographical drama film by Pravin Tarde, covered Anand Dighe and Eknath Shinde's life.  Kshitij Date played the role of Eknath Shinde. Eknath Shinde has a starring role in Dharmaveer as one of Dighe’s most loyal foot soldiers.

References

External links
 Shivsena Home Page

Maharashtra MLAs 2004–2009
Maharashtra MLAs 2009–2014
Maharashtra MLAs 2014–2019
People from Thane
People from Satara district
Shiv Sena politicians
State cabinet ministers of Maharashtra
Living people
Marathi politicians
Politics of Thane district
1964 births
Chief Ministers of Maharashtra